The Milwaukee Brewers (sometimes called the Creams or the Cream Citys) of 1886–1892 were an American professional baseball team and a member of (in order): the Northwestern League, Western Association, American Association, and Western League. Of those leagues, the American Association was considered a major league, while the others were considered minor league.

Major-league history
During the  season, the Cincinnati Kelly's Killers dropped out of the American Association (AA) on August 17, and the Brewers (then members of the Western Association) were recruited to finish the season. As a major-league team, the Brewers were managed by Charlie Cushman and finished their stint in the AA the with a record of 21–15. They played home games at Borchert Field, which was known as Athletic Field or Athletic Park in 1891.

Afterward, four AA clubs joined the National League, while the others were left out as the AA folded. The Brewers moved on to the newly re-formed Western League, but lasted just one more season before folding.

References

American Association (1882–1891) baseball teams
Defunct Western League teams
Defunct Western Association teams
Northwestern League teams
Baseball in Milwaukee
Defunct baseball teams in Wisconsin
Professional baseball teams in Wisconsin
1886 establishments in Wisconsin
1892 disestablishments in Wisconsin
Baseball teams disestablished in 1892
Baseball teams established in 1886